George Lewis "Frenchy" LeClair (October 18, 1886 – October 10, 1918) was a Major League Baseball pitcher who played for three teams in the Federal League in  and . He died at age 31, a victim of the 1918 flu pandemic.

External links

Retrosheet

1886 births
1918 deaths
Deaths from the Spanish flu pandemic in Canada
Pittsburgh Rebels players
Buffalo Blues players
Baltimore Terrapins players
Major League Baseball pitchers
Baseball players from Vermont
Montreal Royals players